The following is a list of events relating to television in Ireland from 1963.

Events

1 June – Gunnar Rugheimer is appointed Controller of Programmes of Telefís Éireann.
26–29 June – RTÉ provides extensive coverage of the visit of U.S. President John F. Kennedy.
18 October – The wildlife programme Amuigh Faoin Spéir airs for the first time.
November – Father Romuald Dodd is appointed to advise on the broadcasting of Catholic Religious Programmes.

Ongoing television programmes
RTÉ News: Nine O'Clock (1961–present)
Jackpot (1962–1965)
Dáithí Lacha (1962–1969)
RTÉ News: Six One (1962–present)
The Late Late Show (1962–present)

Ending this year
4 October – Broadsheet (1962–1963)

Births
4 April – Graham Norton, Irish actor, comedian, television presenter and columnist
7 April – Martin King, weather presenter

See also
1963 in Ireland

References

 
1960s in Irish television